Bassetti is an Italian textile company.

It was founded in Milan in 1830 by Carlo Barboncini, as a textile emporium. In 1840 it opened a  hand-weaving factory at Rescaldina, some 25 km to the north west, which employed around fifty women. Today it forms part of the Zucchi Group, which specialises in the manufacture and distribution of household linen and whose brands include ’Zucchi‘ and ‘Bassetti’  and Mascioni In Italy.

Notes

External links
  

Textile companies of Italy
Italian brands
Manufacturing companies based in Milan
Manufacturing companies established in 1830
1830 establishments in the Austrian Empire
Italian companies established in 1830